Marília Futebol Clube, commonly known as Marília, is a Brazilian football club based in Imperatriz, Maranhão state.

History
The club was founded on November 22, 1984. The club competed in the Campeonato Maranhense Second Level for the first time in 2008.

Stadium
Marília Futebol Clube play their home games at Estádio Municipal José Pereira Rego, nicknamed Pereirão. The stadium has a maximum capacity of 6,000 people.

References

Association football clubs established in 1984
Football clubs in Maranhão
1984 establishments in Brazil